Nilakkatha Chalanangal is a 1970 Indian Malayalam-language film, directed by K. Sukumaran Nair. The film stars Sathyan, Madhu, Jayabharathi and Jose Prakash in the lead roles. The film had musical score by G. Devarajan.The film was produced by EK Sivaram for  Santhi Productions Konni

Cast
Sathyan
Madhu
Jayabharathi
Jose Prakash
Alummoodan
Aranmula Ponnamma
Kottayam Chellappan
S. P. Pillai
Renuka

Soundtrack

References

External links
 

1970 films
1970s Malayalam-language films